The Iraq Central FA League, previously named the Iraq FA Baghdad League and also known as the League of the Institutes due to containing a number of teams representing different Iraqi institutes, was the top-level division of football in Baghdad and its neighbouring cities between 1948 and 1973.

It was controlled by the Iraq Central Football Association and was played under a variety of different formats including a double-elimination format, a round-robin format and a double round-robin format. It was one of four regional league championships played in Iraq at the time, with the others being in Basra, Kirkuk and Mosul. The last champions of the competition were Al-Quwa Al-Jawiya, who won the title in the 1972–73 season.

The regional leagues folded in 1973 and were replaced by the Iraqi National First Division.

List of champions

Most successful teams

Winning managers

See also
 Iraq FA Basra League
 Iraq FA Kirkuk League
 Iraqi National First Division
 Iraqi Premier League
 Iraqi Women's Football League

References

External links
Iraqi Football Website

 
Football leagues in Iraq